Yvon Duhamel (October 17, 1939 – August 17, 2021) was a French Canadian professional motorcycle and snowmobile racer. A six-time winner of the White Trophy, the highest award in Canadian motorcycle racing, he was one of the most accomplished motorcycle racers in Canadian motorsports history. Duhamel was a versatile rider competing in numerous motorcycle racing disciplines including; trials, motocross, ice racing, drag racing, flat track racing and most prominently in road racing as a member of the Kawasaki factory racing team. His motorcycle racing career spanned the transition from the 60 horsepower four-stroke motorcycles of the 1960s, to the 100 horsepower two-stroke motorcycles of the 1970s. Even when Duhamel's motorcycle had a top speed advantage, he never slowed to conserve his machine, which led to spectacular crashes or mechanical failures as often as it led to race victories. Duhamel's reputation as a tenacious competitor with an aggressive riding style earned him the respect of other racers and made him popular with racing fans.

Duhamel competed all year, racing motorcycles in the summer, then switching to snowmobile racing in the winter. He became one of the first factory supported snowmobile racers when he was selected to drive for the Ski-Doo factory racing team in 1969. His snowmobile racing accomplishments culminated with his induction into the Snowmobile Hall of Fame in 1988. In 1999 he was inducted into both the Canadian Motorsport Hall of Fame and the AMA Motorcycle Hall of Fame. In 2007 he was inducted into the Canadian Motorcycle Hall of Fame. Duhamel's sons, Miguel and Mario Duhamel, became successful motorcycle racers during the 1990s, with Miguel Duhamel winning the AMA Superbike championship in 1995 and becoming the all-time leading AMA Superbike race winner in 1998.

Motorsports career

Early racing in Quebec
Duhamel was born in Montreal, Canada where he became an avid bicyclist and established a small bicycle repair shop when he was only 13-years-old. At the age of 15, he bought his first motorcycle, a 500cc Triumph T-100. In 1957, when Duhamel was 17, he began ice racing and the following year he began dirt track racing. Using borrowed riding gear, he finished second in his first dirt track race in Quebec. By 1959, his impressive results earned him the sponsorship of local motorcycle dealer George Davis, who provided him with a BSA Gold Star for dirt track and road racing, and CZ and Jawa machines for motocross and ice racing. He supported his racing activities by working at his brother's service station. 

Duhamel won the Canadian Motorcycle Association's prestigious White Memorial Trophy given to the best performance by a Canadian rider in all racing disciplines six times (1961-1962, 1965-1968). He won the CMA 500cc senior championship in 1961 and 1962, then won the CMA 250cc expert championship in 1964. In dirt track racing he was ranked the top rider in 1963 and then from 1965 to 1968. In motocross racing, he was the top ranked CMA rider in 1965 and 1966. In 1967, he won the CMA road racing championship.

Deeley Yamaha sponsorship
Davis helped launch Duhamel's professional racing career by connecting him with Trev Deeley, the Canadian distributor for Yamaha motorcycles. His timing was fortuitous as, Yamaha was about to introduce new two stroke engined motorcycles that would go on to dominate the next decade of motorcycle racing. In 1967, Canada hosted its first World Championship Grand Prix race at the Mosport Circuit, where Duhamel placed fourth in the 250cc class behind world championship regulars Mike Hailwood, Phil Read and Ralph Bryans. Duhamel began competing for the Deeley Yamaha team at AMA races in the United States such as the Daytona 200 and the Loudon Classic. At the 1968 Daytona 200, He won the 250 lightweight support class ahead of reigning world champion Phil Read, then in the 200-mile main event, he rode a 350cc Yamaha to finish second behind Harley-Davidson’s Cal Rayborn, becoming one of the first two-stroke riders to make a Daytona podium finish. His second place finishing position would be the best result of his career at the Daytona 200, which at the time was considered one of the most prestigious motorcycle races in North America. His son Miguel Duhamel, would become a five-time winner of the event. 

Duhamel also raced in AMA Grand National dirt track events during this period with his best result being a sixth place in the 1968 Sacramento Mile, but uncompetitive dirt track machinery kept him from seriously contesting the Grand National championship. In Canadian racing, Duhamel won the 1968 CMA 500cc expert ice racing championship and scored a second place in the 1968 Canadian observed trials national championship.

In the winter of 1969, Duhamel was selected to drive for Ski-Doo factory racing team, becoming one of the sports first factory supported racers. Duhamel returned to Daytona in March 1969 and repeated his victory in the Daytona 250 lightweight class, beating future 250cc world champion Rodney Gould. He then accomplished one of his most impressive achievements at Daytona when he won the pole position for the 1969 Daytona 200, becoming the first rider to qualify for the event with a lap speed above 150 mph. Duhamel’s pole position on the tiny 350cc Yamaha motorcycle against the larger 750cc four-strokes marked the beginning of the two-stroke era in AMA road racing competitions. Although he started from the pole position, he would retire from the race due to a mechanical failure. He also won the 250cc class at Indianapolis in 1969. 

That winter, Duhamel achieved one of the most impressive victories of his snowmobile racing career when he won the 1970 World Championship Snowmobile Derby held in Eagle River, Wisconsin. Beginning in 1970, he would concentrate his motorcycle activities solely on road racing while continuing to race snowmobiles in the winter. In March 1970 at the Daytona 200, Duhamel's aggressive riding style was highlighted when, he was relegated to the last row of the starting grid because he was unable to post a qualifying time during practice. Once the race started, Duhamel moved up through the field from 79th place to challenge for third place before finishing in fourth place at the end of the race. Later that season he took the 250cc race victory at the Loudon Classic after a fierce battle with Gary Nixon ended when Nixon's bike broke down. In October 1970, Duhamel and Nixon were invited to England to race in the Mallory Park Race of the Year, becoming the first AMA racers to compete in the prestigious event. Duhamel placed ninth on a Yamaha TD2 borrowed from a local Yamaha distributor.

Kawasaki factory racing team

In the winter of 1971, he nearly repeated his victory at the World Championship Snowmobile Derby, but lost in an epic battle with Mike Trapp in one of the most exciting races in the history of the sport. For the 1971 season, Duhamel signed a lucrative contract with the Kawasaki factory racing team to compete in the AMA road racing nationals with 1963 Daytona 200 winner, Ralph White as his teammate. The Kawasaki H1R was known as a fast but fragile motorcycle with an explosive power delivery and brutal riding characteristics that made it extremely difficult to ride. Despite having a temperamental motorcycle, Duhamel was able to give Kawasaki its first AMA national victory on September 5, 1971 at the Talladega Superspeedway.

In the winter of 1972, Duhamel won the grueling, three-day Winnipeg-to-St. Paul I-500 snowmobile race, giving the Ski-Doo factory their only victory in that event. Also in 1972, he helped Ski-Doo set a snowmobile land speed record when he drove a Ski‐Doo XR2 to a clocked speed of 127.3 mph at Booneville, New York.

For 1972 season, White departed and Duhamel was joined by new teammates Gary Nixon and Paul Smart. Kawasaki introduced the H2R wearing the team's trademark neon lime green racing livery and over the next two seasons, Duhamel became Kawasaki's top rider, earning four more national victories with another win at Talladega, and one each at Road Atlanta, Charlotte Motor Speedway and the Ontario Motor Speedway. Despite his victories, reliability and mechanical issues with the H2R often caused him to crash or withdraw from races. At the 1972 Indianapolis national, Duhamel surged into the lead only to have to make a pit stop for mechanical adjustments before rejoining the race in 17th place. His aggressiveness on the race track was once again demonstrated as he raced his way through the field of competitors to finish the race in second place, 32 seconds behind race winner Cal Rayborn.

At the season ending Champion Spark Plug Classic held at the Ontario Motor Speedway, Duhamel once again showed his aggressive racing style against a field of international competitors that included; Phil Read, Jarno Saarinen, Renzo Pasolini, Kel Carruthers, and Kenny Roberts. The race was held with two legs and a 45 minute intermission. Starting the first leg from the last row on the grid, Duhamel raced from 53rd position to 21st place on the first lap. He continued to charge through the field to capture the race lead by lap 16, only to crash out of the race while trying to pass a lapped rider. He started the second leg from the last row due to his first leg crash and worked his way through the field from 37th to 12th place but, retired due to his injury from his first race crash.

On April 8, 1973, before the start of the motorcycle racing season, Duhamel raced a NASCAR Winston Cup race in the 1973 Gwyn Staley 400 held at the North Wilkesboro Speedway. He finished tenth for Junie Donlavey in the No. 90 Truxmore Ford after starting 15th, completing 381 laps of the 400-lap race. Despite his respectable result, Duhamel never switched to car racing due his advanced age and for the fact that he was being paid well to race motorcycles.

His strong performances earned him a place on the North American team for the 1973 Transatlantic Trophy match races. The Transatlantic Trophy match races pitted the best British riders against the top North American road racers on 750cc motorcycles in a six-race series in England. Duhamel ended the series as the top individual points leader with one victory along with two second place finishes. In the 1973 AMA Grand National championship, Duhamel won the last two road races of the season with victories at the Charlotte and Ontario speedways. At Ontario, he led a Kawasaki podium sweep with teammates Gary Nixon and Art Baumann finishing second and third. Kawasaki's domination during this period led motorsports journalists to dub the team as "the Green Meanies", in reference to their lime green paint scheme.

Duhamel's career was impacted by the introduction of the Yamaha TZ750 in 1974 as, the Yamaha became the dominant road racing motorcycle for the next decade with riders such as Kenny Roberts and Steve Baker. He returned as the North American team captain for the 1974 Transatlantic Trophy match races however, because Kawasaki had reduced their racing budget, Duhamel was forced to ride substandard machines. He beat Kenny Roberts and set a new lap record in the first race of the series held at the Brands Hatch circuit but, he proceeded to crash out of subsequent races due to piston seizures. Duhamel sat out the last race of the series out of frustration with his equipment.

In the wake of the 1973 oil crisis, American road racing was at a low point so, Kawasaki decided to focus their attention on Grand Prix motorcycle racing in Europe. Duhamel's popularity among race fans had grown to where he had become one of the most popular motorcycle racers in France. For the 1974 season, he was given the opportunity to compete in the premier 500cc class riding a 500cc H1-RW for the French Kawasaki importer. At the season-opening French Grand Prix held at the challenging Circuit de Charade, Duhamel's Kawasaki suffered a mechanical failure on the third lap of the race. With the arrival of the new water-cooled Suzuki RG 500 and the Yamaha YZR500, Kawasaki's air-cooled triple was rendered obsolete. After the Nations Grand Prix, Duhamel would not participate in any further 500cc races, preferring to concentrate on the Formula 750 championship. At the British round of the 1974 Formula 750 season held at the Silverstone Circuit on August 11th, he scored a second place behind his former teammate Paul Smart, now riding for the Suzuki factory racing team.

Kawasaki introduced the KR750 for the 1975 season and, Duhamel used it to place a close second to multi-time world champion Giacomo Agostini at the 1975 Paul Ricard 200 race, despite having to make two fuel stops to Agostini's one stop. On June 28, 1975, he scored a fifth place finish at the Dutch TT, giving Kawasaki its best result of the year in the 250cc world championships. He returned to the Assen Circuit on July 9, 1975 and won the Dutch round of the 1975 Formula 750 season. He also competed in the FIM Endurance World Championship at the famous 24 Hours of Le Mans and teamed up with Jean-François Baldé to place third at the 1975 Bol d'Or 24-hour endurance race. 

The AMA introduced its first road racing category for production class motorcycles as a support class for the 1975 Laguna Seca national. Kawasaki entered Duhamel on a modified version of the Kawasaki Z1 and, despite his small stature, he was able to muscle the motorcycle to victory. The production class series would eventually become the AMA Superbike Championship in 1986. At the next race held at the Pocono Raceway, he entered the production class race riding a 750cc Kawasaki H2 two stroke motorcycle and won the race. The victory marked the last time a two stroke motorcycle would win a production class race at an AMA road racing event. Duhamel's participation in production class racing gave credibility to the fledging class. 

Duhamel was the sole rider on the Kawasaki factory team in 1976, signed to enter in only three AMA races as he began to reduce his riding schedule. He had lost his motivation due to the frequent mechanical failures of the Kawasaki as, the Yamaha TZ750 began to dominate the 750cc class. Duhamel scored two more podium results in the Canadian rounds of the Formula 750 championship in 1977 and 1978 in his final appearances as a member of the Kawasaki factory racing team.

Later life
Never officially retired, Duhamel reduced his racing activities in the 1980s as he became involved in his sons' racing careers. He funded their early motorcycle racing and helped driving their motor home to race venues. His last major race occurred in 1988 when he teamed up with his sons to compete in the Bol D’Or 24-hour endurance race. He continued to race in historic motorsport events as a member of Team Obsolete in the AHRMA Historic National Series. At the age of 53, he claimed three victories at the 1992 Daytona 200 support races, winning the Formula GP Heavyweight class, the Formula 750 class and finally the BMW Battle of the Legends class. Duhamel was forced to stop racing after suffering injuries in a bad crash during a vintage motorcycle event at the Mosport Circuit.

Duhamel was inducted into the Snowmobile Hall of Fame in 1988, both the Canadian Motorsport Hall of Fame and the AMA Motorcycle Hall of Fame in 1999 and, in 2007 he was inducted into the Canadian Motorcycle Hall of Fame. He died on August 17, 2021 in La Salle, Quebec at the age of 81.

Motorsports career results

Grand Prix motorcycle racing results

(key) (Races in bold indicate pole position; races in italics indicate fastest lap)

NASCAR Winston Cup Series
(key) (Bold – Pole position awarded by qualifying time. Italics – Pole position earned by points standings or practice time. * – Most laps led.)

References

External links
 Yvon Duhamel at the AMA Motorcycle Hall of Fame
 Yvon Duhamel at the Canadian Motorcycle Hall of Fame
 

1939 births
2021 deaths
French Quebecers
People from LaSalle, Quebec
Sportspeople from Montreal
Canadian motorcycle racers
Racing drivers from Quebec
Snowmobile racers
NASCAR drivers
Land speed record people